Boves is a railway station located in Boves, France. It is situated on the Paris–Lille railway. It is served by regional TER Hauts-de-France trains from Amiens to Creil and Compiègne.

References

Boves
Railway stations in France opened in 1846